A Fine Mess may refer to:

Film and television
 A Fine Mess (film), a 1986 comedy by Blake Edwards
 "A Fine Mess" (Beverly Hills, 90210), an episode of Beverly Hills, 90210
 "A Fine Mess" (Code Lyoko), an episode of Code Lyoko
 A Fine Mess, a film and television production company founded by Ed Naha

Music
 A Fine Mess (album), by Kate Voegele, 2009
 A Fine Mess (EP), by Interpol, 2019
 A Fine Mess, an album by David Baerwald, 1999
 "A Fine Mess", a song by The Temptations from To Be Continued...
 "A Fine Mess (You've Gotten Us Into)", a song by Trooper from Thick as Thieves

Other uses
 A Fine Mess, a series of collected comics by Matt Madden
  A Fine Mess: A Global Quest for a Simpler, Fairer, and More Efficient Tax System, a 2017 book by T.R. Reid

See also 
 Another Fine Mess (disambiguation)